Guillermo Durán and Andrés Molteni were the defending champions but chose not to defend his title.

Luke Bambridge and Jonny O'Mara won the title after defeating Yannick Maden and Tristan-Samuel Weissborn 6–2, 6–4 in the final.

Seeds

Draw

References
 Main Draw

2018 ATP Challenger Tour
Doubles